Pennsylvania has fourteen metropolitan statistical areas (MSAs) and four combined statistical areas (CSAs), as defined by the United States Census Bureau. A map of the Pennsylvania MSAs is available from the Census Bureau. As of 2020 Philadelphia is the seventh-largest United States metropolitan area.

Metropolitan statistical areas (MSAs)
The following sortable table lists the 18 MSAs of the Commonwealth of Pennsylvania with the following information:
The MSA rank by population as of July 1, 2020, as estimated by the United States Census Bureau
The MSA name as designated by the United States Office of Management and Budget
The MSA population as of April 1, 2020, as enumerated by the 2020 United States Census
The MSA population as of April 1, 2010, as enumerated by the 2010 United States Census
The percent MSA population change from April 1, 2010, to July 1, 2020
The combined statistical area (CSA) if the MSA is a component

Combined statistical areas (CSAs)
The following sortable table lists the combined statistical areas (CSAs) of the Commonwealth of Pennsylvania with the following information:
CSA rank by population as of July 1, 2020, as estimated by the United States Census Bureau
The CSA name as designated by the United States Office of Management and Budget
The CSA population as of July 1, 2020, as estimated by the United States Census Bureau
CSA population as of April 1, 2010, as enumerated by the 2010 United States Census
Percent CSA population change from April 1, 2010, to July 1, 2020
Core Based Statistical Areas (CBSAs) that constitute the CSA
(Metropolitan Statistical Areas that are not combined with other MSAs or CBSAs are not also listed below.)

See also 
List of cities and boroughs in Pennsylvania by population
List of cities in Pennsylvania
List of metropolitan statistical areas

References

 01
Metro